Innocence Is No Excuse is the seventh studio album by heavy metal band Saxon released in 1985. It was the group's first album for EMI after a falling-out with their previous label, Carrere Records, and their last with original bassist Steve Dawson.

Release and reception
The song "Everybody Up" was used in the 1985 Italian horror film, Demoni.

The album was given a generally positive review by Eduardo Rivadavia of AllMusic, who awarded it four out of five stars. Although he commented in his review for the band's previous album Crusader that this album "would only lead to greater extremes of personality disorder and leave the group's fan base confused and utterly divided", he praised it for being "their strongest collective set of songs since 1981's Denim and Leather" although acknowledged that some of the songs "rubbed many fans the wrong way". He singled out the songs "Back on the Streets", "Rock 'n' Roll Gypsy" and "Broken Heroes" for praise, the latter of which he described as an "excellent ballad". He also pondered the question of what price the album had to the band's "street-level credibility" and said that "the answer will never be agreed upon". Jon Hotten in Classic Rock magazine wrote that the album was "not a huge misstep" and a "response to a glimmer of interest from the US", although "the glossy production lay at odds with Saxons's belt-and-braces take on heavy metal." Martin Popoff, author of The Collector's Guide to Heavy Metal, reviewed negatively the album which represents for Saxon the return "full-steam to the bastions of metal, without an idea in their dust-clouded heads", as shown in the clichéd titles and in the "old age ineptness on this rule-book headbanging fare."

Track listing

Notes
"The Medley" consists of "Heavy Metal Thunder", "Stand Up and Be Counted", "Taking Your Chances" and "Warrior."

Notes
Tracks 13-17: Chapel Studio, Thoresby Demos

Personnel
Biff Byford – vocals
Graham Oliver – guitar
Paul Quinn – guitar
Steve Dawson – bass guitar
Nigel Glockler – drums

Production
Arranged by Saxon
Produced and Recorded by Simon Hanhart; additional recording by Keith Nixon
Recorded at Union Studios, Munich, Germany
Mixed by Saxon and Simon Hanhart at Wisseloord Studios, Hilversum
All titles published by Saxsongs/Carlin Music Corp.

Charts

Album

Singles

References

Saxon (band) albums
1985 albums
EMI Records albums